The European Journal of Clinical Microbiology & Infectious Diseases is a monthly peer-reviewed medical journal covering clinical microbiology and infectious diseases. It was established in 1982 as the European Journal of Clinical Microbiology obtaining its current title in 1987. The founding editor was Ilja Braveny. The editor-in-chief is Laurent Poirel. It is published by Springer Science+Business Media.

Abstracting and indexing
The journal is abstracted and indexed in:

According to the Journal Citation Reports, the journal has a 2013 impact factor of 2.544, ranking it 37th out of 72 journals in the category "Infectious Diseases" and 55th out of 119 journals in the category "Microbiology".

Further reading

References

External links

Microbiology journals
Publications established in 1982
Springer Science+Business Media academic journals
English-language journals
Monthly journals